The Wings Office Complex is a twin 15-story  grade A office building in Victoria Island, Lagos, Nigeria. The Towers which comprise 27000 m2 of office space are also attributed to be green certified.

References

External links

Skyscraper office buildings in Lagos
Twin towers
Sustainable buildings in Nigeria